Nikkanen is a Finnish surname. Notable people with the surname include:

 Kimmo Nikkanen, the first regular host of the free Finnish cable network channel Moon TV
 Marcus Nikkanen (1904–1985), Finnish figure skater
 Minna Nikkanen (born 1988), Finnish pole vaulter 
 Yrjö Nikkanen (1914–1985), Finnish athlete

Finnish-language surnames